Vardø Lighthouse is a coastal lighthouse located on the island of Hornøya, just off the coast of the town of Vardø in Vardø Municipality in Troms og Finnmark county, Norway. It is the easternmost lighthouse in Norway.

Description
 
Vardø Lighthouse was established in 1896 and automated in 1991. The lighthouse was listed as a protected site in 1998.

The light emits a white flash every 30 seconds.

The light burns from 12 August until 24 April each year, but it is off during the summers due to the midnight sun.  The site is located on a rocky island, just off the Vardø harbor. It is only accessible by boat, and it is closed to the public.

See also

Lighthouses in Norway
List of lighthouses in Norway

References

External links
 Norsk Fyrhistorisk Forening 

Lighthouses completed in 1896
Lighthouses in Troms og Finnmark
Listed lighthouses in Norway
Vardø